Blue Reflection Ray is an anime television series that is a spin-off of the 2017 video game, Blue Reflection, serves as a prelude to the 2021 game, Blue Reflection: Second Light and features a new cast of characters. It aired from April to September 2021.

Characters

Production and release
On February 12, 2021, an anime television series spin-off of the video game Blue Reflection by J.C.Staff named Blue Reflection Ray was announced. The series is directed by Risako Yoshida, with Akiko Waba writing and overseeing scripts, Koichi Kikuta adapting Mel Kishida's original character designs for animation, and Daisuke Shinoda composing the series' music. The series aired from April 10 to September 25, 2021, on the Animeism programming block on MBS, TBS, and BS-TBS. EXiNA performed the series' opening theme song, "DiViNE", while ACCAMER performed the series' ending theme song "Saishin". Eir Aoi performed the series' second opening theme song, "Atokku", while ACCAMER performed the series' second ending theme song "fluoresce". Funimation (now Crunchyroll, LLC) licensed the series outside of Asia. Mighty Media has licensed the series in Southeast Asian territories. The series ran for two consecutive cours (seasons).

On June 15, 2021, a Blu-ray release of the series was canceled due to "various reasons." On May 26, 2022, Crunchyroll announced that they will begin streaming the series on June 7, along with an English dub.

Episode list

Notes

References

External links
  
 

2021 anime television series debuts
Anime television series based on video games
Animeism
Fantasy anime and manga
Funimation
J.C.Staff
Magical girl anime and manga
School life in anime and manga